Syriac music may refer to:
Assyrian folk/pop music
Syriac sacral music

See also
Assyrian music (disambiguation)